

457001–457100 

|-bgcolor=#f2f2f2
| colspan=4 align=center | 
|}

457101–457200 

|-bgcolor=#f2f2f2
| colspan=4 align=center | 
|}

457201–457300 

|-bgcolor=#f2f2f2
| colspan=4 align=center | 
|}

457301–457400 

|-bgcolor=#f2f2f2
| colspan=4 align=center | 
|}

457401–457500 

|-bgcolor=#f2f2f2
| colspan=4 align=center | 
|}

457501–457600 

|-bgcolor=#f2f2f2
| colspan=4 align=center | 
|}

457601–457700 

|-bgcolor=#f2f2f2
| colspan=4 align=center | 
|}

457701–457800 

|-id=743
| 457743 Balklavs ||  || Latvian radio astronomer Arturs Balklavs (1933–2005) was Director of the Radioastrophysical Observatory, Latvian Academy of Sciences, and Editor-in-Chief of the magazine Zvaigznota Debess (The Starry Sky). An outstanding promoter of science, a Prize of the Latvian Academy of Sciences is named after him. || 
|}

457801–457900 

|-bgcolor=#f2f2f2
| colspan=4 align=center | 
|}

457901–458000 

|-bgcolor=#f2f2f2
| colspan=4 align=center | 
|}

References 

457001-458000